The World Cup of Golf is a men's golf tournament contested by teams of two representing their country. Only one team is allowed from each country. The players are selected on the basis of the Official World Golf Ranking, although not all of the first choice players choose to compete. The equivalent event for women was the Women's World Cup of Golf, played from 2005 to 2008.

History 
The tournament was founded by Canadian industrialist John Jay Hopkins, who hoped it would promote international goodwill through golf. It began in 1953 as the Canada Cup and changed its name to the World Cup in 1967. With Fred Corcoran as the Tournament Director and the International Golf Association behind it (1955–1977), the World Cup traveled the globe and grew to be one of golf's most prestigious tournaments throughout the 1960s and 1970s, but interest in the event faded to the point that the event was not held in 1981 or 1986.

The tournament was incorporated into the World Golf Championships series from 2000 to 2006. In 2007 it ceased to be a World Golf Championships event, but continued to be sanctioned by the International Federation of PGA Tours.

From 2007 through 2009 the tournament was held at the Mission Hills Golf Club in Shenzhen, China, receiving the name Mission Hills World Cup. There was no tournament in 2010, it having been announced that the event would change from annual to biennial, held in odd-numbered years, to accommodate the 2016 inclusion of golf at the Olympics. The 2011 tournament was at a new venue — Mission Hills Haikou in the Chinese island province of Hainan.

The United States has a clear lead in wins, with 24 as of 2018.

Format 
In 1953, the format was 36 holes of stroke play with the combined score of the two-man team determining the winner. From 1954 to 1999, the format was 72 holes of stroke play. Beginning in 2000, the format became alternating stroke play rounds of bestball (fourball) and alternate shot (foursomes).

The 2013 tournament was primarily an individual event with a team component. The 60-player field was selected based on the Official World Golf Ranking (OWGR) with up to two players per country allowed to qualify (four per country if they are within the top 15 of the OWGR). The format returned to 72 holes of stroke play, with the individuals competing for US$7 million of the $8 million total purse. OWGR points were awarded for the first time. The top two-ranked players from each country competed for the team portion, using combined stroke play scores. The individual portion was similar to what would be used at the 2016 Summer Olympics, except that England, Scotland, and Wales had teams instead of a single Great Britain team as in the Olympics, while Northern Ireland and the Republic of Ireland again played as a single team.

In 2016, the format reverted to that used from 2000 to 2011.

From 1955 to 1999, there was also a separate award, the International Trophy, for the individual with the best 72-hole score.

Team winners

1This was a combined Republic of Ireland and Northern Ireland team. They competed under the Republic of Ireland flag although both golfers were from Northern Ireland.

Performance by nation

Individual winners

Multiple winners

Teammates
4 times: Jack Nicklaus and Arnold Palmer, Fred Couples and Davis Love III
2 times: Kel Nagle and Peter Thomson, Arnold Palmer and Sam Snead

As part of team
6 times: Jack Nicklaus, Arnold Palmer
4 times: Fred Couples, Davis Love III, Sam Snead
2 times: Seve Ballesteros, José María Cañizares, Ernie Els, Dan Halldorson, Bernhard Langer, John Mahaffey, Johnny Miller, Kel Nagle, Manuel Piñero, Peter Thomson, Lee Trevino, Tiger Woods

As individual (International Trophy)
3 times: Jack Nicklaus
2 times: Roberto De Vicenzo, Johnny Miller, Gary Player, Ian Woosnam

References

External links

 
Team golf tournaments
Recurring sporting events established in 1953
1953 establishments in Quebec
International Sports Promotion Society
World championships in golf